Associazione Calcio Milan (AC Milan) are an Italian professional football club based in Milan. Their Youth Sector (it. Settore Giovanile) encompasses several boys' and girls' age-group teams ranging from under-8s up to under-19s. Angelo Carbone is the current Head of the Youth Sector.

AC Milan Primavera are the men's under-19 squad and the highest level team within the set-up. They currently play in the top-tier Campionato Primavera 1 and the Coppa Italia Primavera, as well as representing the club in the UEFA Youth League, either when they qualify through their domestic league or the first team qualifies for the UEFA Champions League.

The Primavera team trains at Milanello alongside the first team and they play the majority of their home games at the Vismara Sports Centre in Milan, which also serves as the training facility for all other teams in the set-up.

Primavera (Under-19)

Current squad
. Shirt numbers refer to Primavera matches. Different numbers may be assigned to players who take part in first-team matches.

Managerial history

  Francesco Zagatti (1965–1970)
  Carlo Scarpato (1970–1971)
  Carlo Annovazzi (1977–1978)
  Paolo Ferrario (1978–1980)
  Italo Galbiati (1980–1982)
  Fabio Capello (1982–1986)
  Italo Galbiati (1986–1987)
  Andrea Valdinoci (1987–1991)
  Carlo Garavaglia (1991–1992)
  Luigi Radice and Maurizio Viscidi (1992–1993)
  Maurizio Viscidi (1993–1994)
  Giorgio Morini (1994–1995)
  Walter De Vecchi (1995–1996)
  Simone Boldini (1996–1997)
  Mauro Tassotti (1997–2002)
  Franco Baresi (2002–2006)
  Filippo Galli (2006–2008)
  Alberigo Evani (2008–2009)
  Giovanni Stroppa (2009–2011)
  Aldo Dolcetti (2011–2013)
  Filippo Inzaghi (2013–2014)
  Cristian Brocchi (2014–2016)
  Stefano Nava (2016–2017)
  Gennaro Gattuso (2017)
  Alessandro Lupi (2017–2018)
  Federico Giunti (2018–2022)
  Christian Terni (2022)
  Ignazio Abate (2022–present)

Youth Sector
The Youth Sector has been responsible for producing some of the club's greatest ever players, including their top three all-time appearance makers, Paolo Maldini, Franco Baresi and Alessandro Costacurta, as well as several players, in recent years, who have managed to become regular players in Serie A. The training facilities are based at the Centro Sportivo Vismara (Vismara Sports Centre), a  site in Gratosoglio, Milan, although the Primavera team train at Milanello alongside the first team.

The Youth Sector encompasses several age-group teams ranging from Under-8s up to Under-18s, divided as follows:

 Boys
 Under-18
 Allievi Nazionali U17
 Allievi Nazionali U16
 Giovanissimi Nazionali U15
 Giovanissimi Regionali A U14
 Giovanissimi Regionali B U13
 Esordienti A U12
 Esordienti B U11
 Pulcini U10
 Pulcini U9
 Primi Calci U8

 Girls
 Women's Primavera (Under-19)
 Allieve Nazionali U17
 Giovanissime U15
 Esordienti U13
 Esordienti U11
 Pulcine U10

Squads

Under-18
. Shirt numbers refer to Primavera matches. For Under-18 matches numbers are issued on a match-by-match basis.

Allievi Nazionali U17
. Shirt numbers refer to Primavera matches. For Under-17 matches numbers are issued on a match-by-match basis.

Allievi Nazionali U16
.  Shirt numbers refer to Primavera matches. For Under-16 matches numbers are issued on a match-by-match basis.

Honours

Primavera
 Campionato Primavera 1: 1
1964–65
 Coppa Italia Primavera: 2
1984–85, 2009–10
 Torneo di Viareggio: 9
1949, 1952, 1953, 1957, 1959, 1960, 1999, 2001, 2014
Blue Stars/FIFA Youth Cup: 2
1958, 1977

Other teams
Campionato Berretti: 7
1971–72, 1981–82, 1982–83, 1984–85, 1989–90, 1993–94, 2008–09
Campionato Allievi Nazionali: 5
1994–95, 1995–96, 2002–03, 2006–07, 2010–11
Campionato Giovanissimi Nazionali: 3
1991–92, 2009–10, 2021-22

References

Youth Sector
Football academies in Italy
UEFA Youth League teams